Lohar Khan Chak (Persian: لوہر خان چک) was the 34th Sultan of Kashmir. He, with the help of his Wazīr Abdal Bhat, toppled the government of his predecessor Sayyid Mubarak and ascended the throne in November 1579 thus restoring and becoming the sixth ruler of the Chak dynasty.

References 

Sultans of Kashmir